A random permutation is a random ordering of a set of objects, that is, a permutation-valued random variable.  The use of random permutations is often fundamental to fields that use randomized algorithms such as coding theory, cryptography, and simulation.  A good example of a random permutation is the shuffling of a deck of cards:  this is ideally a random permutation of the 52 cards.

Generating random permutations

Entry-by-entry brute force method
One method of generating a random permutation of a set of length n uniformly at random (i.e., each of the n! permutations is equally likely to appear) is to generate a sequence by taking a random number between 1 and n sequentially, ensuring that there is no repetition, and interpreting this sequence (x1, ..., xn) as the permutation

 

shown here in two-line notation.

This brute-force method will require occasional retries whenever the random number picked is a repeat of a number already selected.  This can be avoided if, on the ith step (when x1, ..., xi − 1 have already been chosen), one chooses a number j at random between 1 and n − i + 1 and sets xi equal to the jth largest of the unchosen numbers.

Fisher-Yates shuffles
A simple algorithm to generate a permutation of n items uniformly at random without retries, known as the Fisher–Yates shuffle, is to start with any permutation (for example, the identity permutation), and then go through the positions 0 through n − 2 (we use a convention where the first element has index 0, and the last element has index n − 1), and for each position i swap the element currently there with a randomly chosen element from positions i through n − 1 (the end), inclusive. It's easy to verify that any permutation of n elements will be produced by this algorithm with probability exactly 1/n!, thus yielding a uniform distribution over all such permutations.

unsigned uniform(unsigned m); /* Returns a random integer 0 <= uniform(m) <= m-1 with uniform distribution */

void initialize_and_permute(unsigned permutation[], unsigned n)
{
    unsigned i;
    for (i = 0; i <= n-2; i++) {
        unsigned j = i+uniform(n-i); /* A random integer such that i ≤ j < n */
        swap(permutation[i], permutation[j]);   /* Swap the randomly picked element with permutation[i] */
    }
}

Note that if the uniform() function is implemented simply as random() % (m) then a bias in the results is introduced if the number of return values of random() is not a multiple of m, but this becomes insignificant if the number of return values of random() is orders of magnitude greater than m.

Statistics on random permutations

Fixed points

The probability distribution of the number of fixed points in a uniformly distributed random permutation approaches a Poisson distribution with expected value 1 as n grows. In particular, it is an elegant application of the inclusion–exclusion principle to show that the probability that there are no fixed points approaches 1/e. When n is big enough, the probability distribution of fixed points is almost the Poisson distribution with expected value 1. The first n moments of this distribution are exactly those of the Poisson distribution.

Randomness testing 
As with all random processes, the quality of the resulting distribution of an implementation of a randomized algorithm such as the Knuth shuffle (i.e., how close it is to the desired uniform distribution) depends on the quality of the underlying source of randomness, such as a pseudorandom number generator. There are many possible randomness tests for random permutations, such as some of the Diehard tests. A typical example of such a test is to take some permutation statistic for which the distribution is known and test whether the distribution of this statistic on a set of randomly generated permutations closely approximates the true distribution.

See also 
 Ewens's sampling formula — a connection with population genetics
 Faro shuffle
 Golomb–Dickman constant
 Random permutation statistics
 Shuffling algorithms — random sort method, iterative exchange method
 Pseudorandom permutation

References

External links 
 Random permutation at MathWorld
 Random permutation generation -- detailed and practical explanation of Knuth shuffle algorithm and its variants for generating k-permutations (permutations of k elements chosen from a list) and k-subsets (generating a subset of the elements in the list without replacement) with pseudocode

Permutations
Randomized algorithms